Cacaopera is a municipality in the Morazán department of El Salvador.

Cacaopera may also refer to:

Cacaopera people, an indigenous people in El Salvador
Cacaopera language, an extinct indigenous language in El Salvador